USS Shrike (MHC-62) is the twelfth and last ship of Osprey-class coastal mine hunters.

References

External links
NavSource Naval History

 

1997 ships
Osprey-class coastal minehunters